Akashdeep Singh Kahlon (born 26 July 1993) is an Indian professional footballer who plays as a defender for Real Kashmir in the I-League.

Career statistics

Club

References

1993 births
Living people
Indian footballers
I-League players
RoundGlass Punjab FC players
Indian Arrows players
Association football defenders
Sportspeople from Gurdaspur district
Footballers from Punjab, India
Sudeva Delhi FC players
I-League 2nd Division players
Rajasthan United FC players